Tetrarhanis diversa, the diverse on-off, is a butterfly in the family Lycaenidae. It is found in Guinea, Sierra Leone, Liberia and Ivory Coast. The habitat consists of primary forests.

References

Butterflies described in 1904
Poritiinae